Wulf Schiefenhövel (born 2 October 1943) is a German medical anthropologist. He has been associated with the Max Planck Institute for Ornithology (the former Max Planck Institute for Behavioral Physiology) since 1975, and is now the head of their Human Ethology department.

References

External links
great human odyssey: episode-2: the-adaptable-ape, CBC Television. Available in Canada only perhaps. September 10, 2015.

Living people
1943 births
Medical anthropologists
German anthropologists
Ethologists